Birmingham City Council is the local government body responsible for the governance of the City of Birmingham in England, which has been a metropolitan district since 1974. It is the most populated local council area in the United Kingdom (excluding counties) with 101 elected councillors representing over one million people, in 69 wards. The council headquarters are at the Council House in the city centre. The council is responsible for running nearly all local services, with the exception of those run by joint boards. The provision of certain services has in recent years been devolved to several council constituencies, which each have a constituency committee made up of councillors from that district. It is part of the West Midlands Combined Authority.

History

The original Charter of Incorporation, dated 31 October 1838, was received in Birmingham on 1 November, then read in the Town Hall on 5 November with elections for the first Birmingham Town Council being held on 26 December. Sixteen aldermen and 48 councillors were elected and the Borough was divided into 13 wards. William Scholefield became the first Mayor and William Redfern was appointed as Town Clerk.

It was not until 14 January 1889 that another Charter conferred the rank of City on Birmingham. On 9 November 1891, the districts of Balsall Heath, Harborne, Saltley and Little Bromwich were absorbed into the City. The dignity of a Lord Mayor was conferred in 1896 and Sir James Smith Kt was appointed as the City's first Lord Mayor on 3 June 1896. The parish of Quinton became part of Birmingham on 9 November 1909 and two years later, under what was termed 'The Greater Birmingham Scheme', the Boroughs of Aston Manor, the Urban Districts of Handsworth and of Erdington, part of the Urban District of Kings Norton and Northfield and the Rural District of Yardley were all incorporated. Such was the expansion involved that the Council Chamber, originally designed to accommodate 80 members, had to be modified to seat the representatives of the new wards. Further additions occurred on 1 April 1928 (most of the Perry Barr Urban District) and 1 April 1931 (parts of the Parishes of Solihull, Castle Bromwich, Minworth and Sheldon). By 1972, there were 39 Wards each represented by an alderman and three councillors, a total of 156 members.

A major national re-organisation of local government was implemented in 1974 and saw the City of Birmingham being combined with the Borough of Sutton Coldfield to form the new Birmingham District Council consisting of 42 Wards each with 3 elected Councillors (in 1982 the number of Wards was reduced to 39). On 1 July 1986, the title was changed to Birmingham City Council. Part of Bromsgrove District known as Frankley and Kitwell Estates was added to the City on 1 April 1995. A review of the Ward boundaries on 10 June 2004 resulted in an increase from 39 Wards to 40 Wards.

Women 

The first woman elected  to the council, on 1 November 1911, was Ellen Pinsent. She represented the Edgbaston Ward as a Liberal Unionist. She had earlier been co-opted as a member of the council's Education Committee and served as Chairman of the Special School Sub-Committee. She stood down from the council in October 1913 upon appointment as Commissioner for the Board of Control for Lunacy and Mental Deficiency.

Pinsent's time on the council overlapped with that of Margaret Frances Pugh, who was elected on 22 November 1911 to serve in the North Erdington ward. She resigned in November 1913.

Birmingham's third woman councillor, Clara Martineau, was elected on 14 October 1913 in the Edgbaston ward, and served until 1932, when she died, aged 57. Her father was former Mayor Sir Thomas Martineau, Lord Mayor Ernest Martineau was her brother, and Alderman Sir George Kenrick was her uncle.

Mary E. Cottrell became the first female Labour councillor in February 1917, when she was elected unopposed to the Selly Oak ward.

The first female Lord Mayor, Marjorie Brown, held the post from 1973 to 1974. Theresa Stewart became the first female leader in October 1993, until 1999; and Lin Homer the first chief executive, was in post from 2002 until 2005.

Political control

The council was run by a Labour administration between 1984 and 2004, with Sir Dick Knowles as Council Leader from 1984 to 1993, followed in turn by Theresa Stewart, and Sir Albert Bore. They lost overall control in 2003 but continued to run the council as a minority administration for the following year. At the election of 10 June 2004, the 121 seats were divided between the Labour, (53 councillors), Conservative (39) and Liberal Democrat (28) parties. The Conservative and Liberal Democrat groups then formed a governing coalition, moving Labour into opposition.

In 2005, Richard Mawrey QC (as an election commissioner) ruled invalid Birmingham City Council elections in two wards, Aston and Bordesley Green, held the year before, and required re-votes. He blamed most of the electoral fraud on absentee ballot manipulation, and implicated the returning officer and six Labour councillors. By-elections and defections in 2005 altered the distribution of seats within the council with Labour holding 46 seats, Conservatives holding 40, Liberal Democrats holding 30, the People's Justice Party holding 2 and independent councillors holding a further 2.

In 2006, the People's Justice Party disbanded, with their two councillors joining the Liberal Democrats, and Councillor Ann Holtom defected from Labour to the Liberal Democrats. In the 2006 local elections the British National Party initially gained a seat, but it soon transpired their candidate's election had been caused by a counting error and the result was subsequently overturned in favour of the previously third-placed Labour party candidate following an election petition.

After the local elections on 1 May 2008, there remained no overall control, with the 120 seats divided between Conservative (49 councillors), Labour, (36), Liberal Democrat (32) and Respect (3). After the 2010 elections the seats were divided between Conservative (45 councillors), Labour, (41), Liberal Democrat (31) and Respect (3). The Conservatives' main local strongholds are in the Sutton Coldfield and Edgbaston constituencies. In the local elections on 5 May 2011, Labour won an extra 14 seats on the council but there continued to be no overall control, with the seats divided between Conservative (39 councillors), Labour, (55), Liberal Democrat (24) and Respect (3).

Labour regained overall control in May 2012. Following the 2022 council election, Labour continues to hold control of the council.

Wards and councillors
Following the boundary review, the number of wards was increased from 40 to 69.

Each ward is represented by either one or two councillors.

Council constituencies
From 5 April 2004, responsibility and budgets for a number of services were devolved to 11 district committees, as part of a growing trend in the UK to use area committees for large councils. From 1 June 2006 the districts were reduced from 11 to 10 to correspond with the revised Westminster constituency boundaries, and renamed "council constituencies". Each now comprises four wards. The council constituencies are: As of 2018 these districts no longer serve as a devolved function.

 Edgbaston
 Erdington
 Hall Green
 Hodge Hill
 Ladywood
 Northfield
 Perry Barr
 Selly Oak
 Sutton Coldfield
 Yardley

Chief executives 

Past chief executives have included:

 
 

 
 
 
 
2019  2020 Clive Heaphy (Acting)
2020  Chris Naylor (Interim)
2021  Deborah Cadman

Services and facilities 

Notable services provided and facilities managed by Birmingham City Council include:

 Library of Birmingham
 Public Library and Baths, Balsall Heath
 Birmingham Wholesale Markets
 Cemeteries
 Brandwood End Cemetery
 Handsworth Cemetery
 Lodge Hill Cemetery
 Witton Cemetery
 Council House
 Hall of Memory
 Parks
 Brookvale Park
 Calthorpe Park
 Handsworth Park
 Kings Heath Park
 Swanshurst Park
 Several country parks

Service Birmingham, set up in 2006, is a joint IT venture operated by Birmingham City Council and Capita under which Capita runs the city's ICT systems and council tax collection services and formerly ran its call centre. The Council and Capita have agreed to end the joint venture by March 2018.

The city's museums were transferred to the independent Birmingham Museums Trust in 2012. The council sold its Ogwen Cottage Outdoor Pursuits Centre, by auction, in October 2014.

Highways
In 2010, Birmingham City Council agreed a 25 year deal with Amey plc to manage the city's highways, but, after allegations of sub-standard repairs to roads and pavements, the council invoked penalty clauses and entered into a prolonged legal dispute. In December 2018, Amey parent Ferrovial put the business up for sale, after allocating €237m for losses on Amey's highway maintenance contract with the Council. In February 2019, Amey was close to a deal to exit its Birmingham contract, liabilities from which were preventing the company's sale by Ferrovial. A £215m deal to terminate Amey's Birmingham contract was confirmed in July 2019. The council was set to receive £160m in 2019 with a further £55m paid over the next six years, with services continuing on an interim basis until September 2019, and potentially until March 2020. However, in February 2020, it was announced the Birmingham contract would end in March 2020; Kier Group was appointed as interim contractor for 15 months while the council sought a permanent replacement for Amey. In February 2022, the city council formally began the process of identifying a contractor to deliver £2.7 billion of works over 12 years.

See also 
 Government of Birmingham
 Birmingham Baths Committee
 Redevelopment of Birmingham
 City Architect of Birmingham

References

External links
 Birmingham City Council
 Birmingham City Council news
 Birmingham City Council on OpenlyLocal

 
Politics of Birmingham, West Midlands
Metropolitan district councils of England
Local education authorities in England
Local authorities in the West Midlands (county)
Billing authorities in England
Leader and cabinet executives
1974 establishments in England